Won't Last a Day Without You is a 2011 Filipino romantic comedy film directed by Raz dela Torre and starring Sarah Geronimo and Gerald Anderson with the special participation of Joey de Leon. The film was produced and released by Star Cinema and Viva Films. It was released on November 30, 2011, in the Philippines.

Plot
Awarded radio personality George Harrison Apostol, known as DJ Heidee to her listeners (Sarah Geronimo), provides love advice to people who are having problems in their relationships. DJ Heidee receives a call from a girl named Melissa (Megan Young) who is asking advice on how to break up with her boyfriend Andrew (Gerald Anderson). Unfortunately, Andrew is listening to the same program and hears Heidee telling Melissa how they should break up. Andrew blames Heidee for what happened and even threatens to sue her for giving that particular advice. In order to prevent a legal battle, and to ease her conscience, Heidee decides to help Andrew win Melissa back. In the process of getting the two together, Andrew and Heidee begin to feel an attraction toward each other. Will they be able to overcome their past and become lovers instead?

Cast

Sarah Geronimo as George Apostol/DJ Heidee
Gerald Anderson as Andrew Escalona
Joey de Leon as Pablo Apostol
John Lapus as DJ Ram
Megan Young as Melissa
Martin del Rosario as Duke
Niña Dolino as Paraluman/Pars
Marlann Flores as Carol
Cheska Ortega as Yumi Apostol
Young JV as Jeff
Lui Villaruz as Sir Bong
Jommy Teotico as Dom
Yam Concepcion as Anne
Robi Domingo as Oscar
Helga Krapf as Lauren
Anna Luna as DJ Petunya
JB Agustin as Elvis
Jef Gaitan as Sexy Girl

Reception

Box office
The film opened with ₱20 million gross of total receipts. On its third week it grossed ₱88 million.

Critics
Philbert Dy of Click the City said “It is a film that seems willing to acknowledge that relationships can be messy, and that people do get hurt and that it isn’t always easy to forgive. While the bad habits are still there, there is a charming core to the picture that seems truer than many of the things the mainstream has put out there.”

Abby Mendoza of Philippine Entertainment Portal quoted “Raz dela Torre’s film could have oh-so-melodramatically tackled the aforementioned heartbreak crisis… Instead, it does a favour to those who are in the process of healing by taking bitterness as a genuine emotion that only the failure of love can produce, and creating a feel-good, fresh, and hopeful narrative out of it.”

References

External links

2011 films
Philippine romantic comedy films
Filipino-language films
Star Cinema films
Viva Films films